Sarah-Lee Heinrich (born March 22, 2001, in Iserlohn, Germany) is a German politician for the German Green Party and one of the two speakers of its youth organization, Grüne Jugend.

Early life and education 
Heinrich grew up in poverty, being brought up by a single mother on welfare (Hartz IV).

Heinrich completed her abitur at the Pestalozzi-Gymnasium in Unna in 2019, and studied Politics, Sociology and Philosophy from 2019 to 2020 at the University of Bonn before studying Social Sciences from 2020 at the University of Cologne.

Political career 
In 2017, she joined the youth organization Grünen Jugend and founded a local chapter in Unna. She was speaker of this local chapter from 2017 to 2019. In 2019, she was speaker of Grünen Jugend Ruhr.

At October 9, 2021, she was elected with 93.8% of the votes as one of the two federal speakers of the Grüne Jugend. After her election, offensive tweets she wrote at the age of 13 and 14 and deleted since then were discussed publicly, after right-wing social media accounts and the tabloid newspaper Bild reported about them initially. Heinrich apologized for those Tweets and called them "wrong and hurtful". Due to vehement attacks like death threats, she temporarily withdrew from the public for a few days.

Political positions and activism 
Heinrich advocates for social justice. She criticizes the welfare system Hartz IV where she demands higher benefits and opposes benefit sanctions. She first gained media attention for criticizing Hartz IV in 2018 when she complained in a tweet that she didn't have enough money to move out for college, and Hartz IV wouldn't even allow her to earn additional money without reducing benefits.

She is committed to anti-racism with an emphasis on corporate exploitation of e.g. immigrants. Heinrich also campaigns for climate change mitigation where she aims for systemic changes. She is active in the trade union ver.di.

In an interview with Tilo Jung, Heinrich said her political views were inspired by Bernie Sanders and his approach to unite working class interests with anti-racism and climate change mitigation in his 2016 presidential campaign.

References

External Links 
 Heinrich on Twitter
 Heinrich on Instagram

21st-century German women politicians
2001 births
People from Iserlohn
University of Bonn alumni
Living people
Politicians from North Rhine-Westphalia
Alliance 90/The Greens politicians